Baileya pauciradiata is a species of flowering plant in the daisy family which is known by the common names laxflower and Colorado desert marigold. It is native to the deserts of northwestern Mexico and the southwestern United States. It has been found in the States of California, Arizona, Nevada, Baja California, and Sonora.

Description
Baileya pauciradiata is an annual or perennial herb with a gray-green downy stem branching to heights between 10 and 50 centimeters. The leaves are linear or lance-shaped and measure 4 to 14 centimeters long. Those at the base of the plant wither while those along the stem generally remain as the plant flowers.

The inflorescence is composed of 2 or 3 flower heads. Each has a few three-lobed yellow ray florets around a center of yellow disc florets. The fruit is a club-shaped achene about half a centimeter long.

Food source
This plant is the main food source for the sand dune dwelling moth Schinia pallicincta.

References

External links
Jepson Manual Treatment
United States Department of Agriculture Plants Profile
Calphotos Photo gallery, University of California

Helenieae
Flora of the Southwestern United States
Flora of Northwestern Mexico
Flora of the California desert regions
Flora of the Sonoran Deserts
Plants described in 1849
Flora without expected TNC conservation status